Henry Gritten (1818 – 14 January 1873) was an English/Australian landscape painter.

Biography
Gritten was the son of a London picture dealer. He studied art and was on friendly terms with David Roberts and other leading artists of the period. He began exhibiting at the Royal Academy in 1835, and during the next 10 years 12 of his pictures were hung at its exhibitions. He was a more frequent exhibitor at the British Institution, and had some of his pictures hung there between 1836 and 1848. In 1848 Gritten went to the United States in Brooklyn and exhibited at the American Art Union (1850 to 1851) and the National Academy of Design (1850 to 1854).  Gritten painted two New Hampshire scenes which were  exhibited at the National Academy of Design: Kearsarge Mountain (1850) and Recollection of New Hampshire Scenery (1851).

In 1853 Gritten arrived in Australia, initially trying prospecting at the Bendigo goldfields, but soon resumed painting in Victoria and Tasmania. A View of Hobart (1857) by Gritten hangs at the National Library of Australia at Canberra. He was represented at the first exhibition of the Victorian Academy of Art held at Melbourne in 1870. He died suddenly at Melbourne leaving a widow and four children in poor circumstances.

Gritten was a capable painter of his time who had a hard struggle in Australia. He is represented in the National Gallery of Victoria and Connell collections, Melbourne, the Mitchell Library, Sydney, and the Commonwealth National Library, Canberra.

References
Henry Gritten (1818-1873) at White Mountain Art

External links

Henry Gritten at ArtCyclopedia, list of paintings in galleries
Henry C. Gritten   (Australian, 1818-1873)  at ArtNet —  top 3 sales results

1818 births
1873 deaths
19th-century Australian artists
19th-century English painters
English male painters
Australian people of English descent
19th-century English male artists